DXZB (89.9 FM), broadcasting as 89.9 Brigada News FM, is a radio station owned and operated by Brigada Mass Media Corporation. Its studios are located along Mayor Vitaliano Agan Ave., Brgy. Camino Nuevo, Zamboanga City; while its transmitter is located in Sitio Muruk, Brgy. Pasonanca, Zamboanga City.

The station was formerly known as Bay Radio from 1992 to 2013, when Brigada acquired Baycomms Broadcasting Corporation. Brigada News FM was formerly on 93.1 FM from its inception in August 2013 to the middle of 2015, when it transferred to this frequency.

References

Radio stations in Zamboanga City
Radio stations established in 1992